A Hawaiian hurricane is a tropical cyclone that forms in the Pacific Ocean and affects the Hawaiian Islands. Hawaii lies in the central Pacific, where about four or five tropical cyclones appear each year, although as many as fifteen have occurred, such as in the 2015 season; rarely do these storms actually affect Hawaii. Tropical cyclone records were not kept before the 1950s. Earlier windstorms that struck Hawaii were not labeled as hurricanes. Extratropical cyclones are also common, causing considerable damage; they are known as Kona storms, but are not included in counts of  hurricanes.

List of tropical cyclones

This list contains every tropical cyclone that had a somewhat notable effect on the State of Hawaii.

Pre–1950
September 1843: The earliest report of a tropical cyclone that could have affected Hawaii was made in 1843. On September 23, a German ship recorded a cyclone (known later as the "Cyclone of the Lark") near 17°N and 141°W. No further records are available, but extrapolation of its forward movement predicted that it would make landfall on the southern coast of the Big Island of Hawaii.
August 9, 1871: Indigenous newspapers record a major category 3 hurricane causing significant damage across the islands of Hawai'i and Maui.
December 1902–03: A low-pressure system (known later as "The Froc Cyclone") that took a path similar to that of a tropical cyclone, passed through Kaulakahi Channel in late December 1902. No records of unusual weather were recorded, so the storm was likely still forming as it crossed Hawaii.
Heavy rains were recorded; "the heaviest in years". A little over  fell in 4½ hours.
The storm supposedly tracked northward, passing through the Kauai channel. This cyclone must have been abnormally small or very weak, because climatological records show no unusual rainfall, wind, surge, or low pressure. The storm dissipated near British Columbia.
August 1925: In August high seas and gusty winds were recorded in Hawaii from a nearby tropical cyclone.
August 1938: Again in August a possible tropical cyclone produced heavy wind and rain in the state.

1950s
August 1950: Hurricane Hiki passed north of the islands, bringing gale winds.  winds were recorded in Kauai. Additionally, at total of 52 inches (1321 mm) of rain fell over 4 days in Kauai. One person died from Hiki.
July 1957: Hurricane Kanoa, after taking a long journey across the eastern Pacific, became a non-tropical circulation a few miles east of Hawaii. The remnants of Kanoa brought welcomed rain.
November 1957: Hurricane Nina was a Category 1 hurricane that formed in November south of Hawaii. Nina moved north and took a sharp turn to the west without actually striking the state. Nina set a record for the highest wind gust ever recorded in Honolulu: . Nina killed four people throughout the islands.
August 1958: On August 7, a tropical storm seemed to rapidly appear directly off the coast of Hilo. It moved across the islands, dropping considerable rainfall and causing about $500,000 of damage, before dissipating.
August 1959: Hurricane Dot was another powerful August arrival. Dot entered the Central Pacific as a Category 4 hurricane just south of Hawaii. On August 5, Dot seemed to turn more northwest, aiming it directly at Kauai. On the 6th, Dot began weakening, and at its landfall in Kauai, Dot was only a Category 1 hurricane. No Dot-related deaths were recorded.

1960s
September 1963: Tropical Storm Irah crossed the islands as a tropical depression, bringing  winds, but caused little damage.
August 1966: Hurricane Connie brought heavy rain to  Big Island and Maui without making landfall.

1970s

January 1971: Although not having existed in the Central Pacific as a tropical cyclone, the extratropical low that was Tropical Storm Sarah in the West Pacific passed over Hawaii in mid January, causing high winds and heavy rain.
July 1971: Hurricane Denise dissipated before reaching Hawaii, but brought beneficial rain of over one inch to dry farms and sugarcane plantations. Denise's outer winds helped Sheila Scott while she was flying solo around the world and a boat named Winward Passage won the Transpacific Yacht Race. Both were headed to Honolulu.
September 1972: Hurricane Fernanda may have caused flash flooding near Waipio as it passed to the northeast.
August 1976: Tropical Storm Gwen passed north of Hawaii, dropping  of rain across the entire state.
July 1978: Hurricane Fico created  waves, felled trees and knocked out power across the islands.

1980s

July 1982: Hurricane Daniel passed through the islands as a tropical depression, causing little if any damage.
November 1982: Hurricane Iwa was one of Hawaii's most damaging hurricanes. Iwa was the most damaging hurricane to ever hit Hawaii until Hurricane Iniki took over the title 10 years later.
July–August 1983: Hurricane Gil passed over northern Hawaii as a tropical storm, causing minor damage.
October 1983: Hurricane Raymond took a path similar to Gil's, but as a depression, causing no damage.
July 1985: Hurricane Ignacio, although missing the islands, generated surf that measured from  causing damage to coastal roads and structures. Only light rain was reported.
July 1986: Waves caused by Hurricane Estelle caused  in damage when they destroyed five houses and damaged several others. Two people on Oahu drowned in rough surf.
August 1988: Hurricane Uleki approached the state. Two drownings on Oahu were attributed to rough surf caused by the hurricane.
July 1989: Hurricane Dalilia dropped heavy rains over Hawaii, setting a new July record for Honolulu International Airport,  in 24 hours. Rain was heavier elsewhere, with up to  falling near the North Shore.

1990s

August 1991: Hurricane Fefa dissipated shortly before landfall. Two people were injured by lightning. Locally strong wind gusts reached  at some localities, mainly over Hawaii and Maui. Some heavy downpours occurred, particularly on the Big Island. Localized flash flooding was reported in the Kohala and Hamakua districts.
July 1992: Hurricane Georgette brought locally squally winds over the state as a depression. Several large waterspouts were sighted off Hapuna Beach in the South Kohala district.
September 1992: Hurricane Iniki caused more damage than any other hurricane to affect Hawaii since records began. It hit the island of Kauai as a Category 4 on September 11. Iniki caused $3.1 billion in damage, mainly to Kauai. It remains the costliest East/Central Pacific hurricane on record. Six died as a result.
September 1992: Hurricane Orlene struck Hawaii as a tropical depression causing heavy rainfall, washing out roads, shortly after Iniki ravaged the island.
July 1993: Hurricane Eugene dropped valuable rain on the state as it dissipated. Minor power outages and rain made traffic conditions hazardous. One fisherman was reported missing.
Shoreline roads on all islands were damaged and some homes flooded.
July 1994: Tropical Storm Daniel dumped  of rain over the windward slopes of Big Island. Moderate surf of up to  affected the east and southeast shorelines on the Big Island.
July 1994: Hurricane Emilia damaged trees and foliage while passing south of Hawaii. Surf reached  along the Puna and Kau shorelines.
July 1994: The remnants of Tropical Storm Fabio brought heavy showers to Big Island and Oahu.
August 1994: Tropical Depression One-C passed just south of the islands, causing severe flooding in Hilo.

2000s

August 2000: Hurricane Daniel passed north of the islands, bringing a few thunderstorms but no significant flooding. High surf with waves of up to  impacted the eastern side of the island of Hawaii.
September 2005: An upper-level trough which had resulted in the remnants of Hurricane Jova brought unstable conditions to Hawaii, allowing locally heavy rainfall to occur.
September 2005: The remnants of Hurricane Kenneth brought locally heavy rainfall, with up to  falling on the Big Island of Hawaii. Intense rains over Oahu and Kauai caused flash floods on Kaukonahua Stream and the overflow of Lake Wilson at Wahiawa Dam. Flash floods occurred on Hanalei River forcing the closure of Kuhio Highway.
August 2007: Hurricane Flossie passed within  of the Big Island of Hawaii bringing rain and tropical storm-force winds to the island.
August 2008: The remnants of Hurricane Hernan  brought moisture to the island of Hawaii causing cloud and shower activity.
August 2009: The remnants of Hurricane Felicia brought light rainfall to the northern islands.
October 2009: Hurricane Neki caused minor damage to the Northwestern Hawaiian Islands, striking the Papahānaumokuākea Marine National Monument as a tropical storm.

2010s

December 2010: Tropical Storm Omeka brushed Lisianski Island as a weak tropical storm, although no damage was reported.
July 2013: Tropical Storm Flossie passed just north of the Hawaiian Islands before dissipated.
August 2014: Hurricane Iselle made landfall in the southeastern part of the Island of Hawaii as a moderate tropical storm. Hurricane warnings were issued on the island, the first occurrence since 1992. Upon landfall, Iselle brought heavy rain, flooding and minor structural damage. Overall, Iselle caused $148 million (2014 USD) in damage, mainly to the papaya crop. One person was killed indirectly having been swept away by a stream engorged with heavy rain from the storm.
Damage was limited to a few downed trees.
August 2015: Hurricane Kilo passed well south of Island of Hawaii as a tropical depression, it brought enhanced moisture into Hawaii, leading to locally heavy rainfall in that state.
August 2015: Hurricane Loke brushed Pearl and Hermes Atoll as a minimal hurricane, although no damage was reported.
September 2015: Hurricane Jimena passed well north of the Hawaiian islands before dissipated, it brought scattered heavy rains to Hawaii.
September 2015: Tropical Storm Malia brushed Maro Reef as a weak tropical storm, although no damage was reported.
September 2015: Tropical Storm Niala passes to the southeast of the Big Island, bringing tropical storm force winds to the island. Flood and High Wind Advisories were released.
July 2016: Moisture associated with the remnants of Hurricane Blas brought showers to Hawaii. Peak daily rainfall totals primarily ranged between 1 and 2 in (25 to 50 mm) and did not cause any serious flooding.
July 2016: Large swells as high as 15 ft (4.6 m) generated by the remnants of Hurricane Celia affected the east-facing shores of the Hawaiian Islands. These swells produced rough surf that caused two drowning deaths on the southeastern shore of the island of Oahu on July 16.
July 2016: Hurricane Darby made landfall in southeast Island of Hawaii as a minimal tropical storm. Darby brought heavy rain and widespread flash floods to the windward sides of the Hawaiian Islands, however, overall damage was minor. 
July 2016: Remnant moisture from Hurricane Georgette brought heavy rain to Oahu on July 31 but caused only minor flooding.
August 2016: The remnants of Tropical Storm Howard moved across the main Hawaiian Island group on August 7, dropping up to 2 in (51 mm) of rain over portions of Kauai, Oahu, and Maui, with minor flooding occurring on northwestern Oahu and northern sections of Maui.
September 2016: Hurricane Madeline passes to the southeast of the Big Island as a weakening tropical storm, producing heavy rain and gusty winds. Total rainfall accumulations amounted up to 5–11 inches (13–28 cm) across the Big Island.
September 2016: Hurricane Lester passed slowly to the northeast of the islands as a category 1 hurricane. Its outer rainbands produced heavy showers and minor flooding over the leeward slopes of the Big Island and portions of east Maui.
July 2017: The remnants of Hurricane Fernanda passed to the north of the islands on July 24, producing thunderstorms and heavy showers in the region.
At least 90 people had to be rescued off the shores of Oahu due to dangerous swells generated by the cyclone.
August 2018: Hurricane Lane slowly approached the islands from the southeast, peaking as a powerful Category 5 hurricane (one of only two recorded within 350 miles of the state), prompting the issuance of hurricane watches and warnings for every island in Hawaii and becoming the first major threat to the state since Hurricane Iniki. In Koloa, a man drowned after jumping in a river to save a dog.
A high surf warning was issued for the eastern shores of Maui and the Island of Hawaii, although no damage was reported.
September 2018: Hurricane Walaka struck the French Frigate Shoals as a category 3 hurricane completely destroying the uninhabited East Island in the atoll.
September 2018: Hurricane Olivia made landfall in northwest Maui as a minimal tropical storm, becoming the first storm on record to make landfall on the island since reliable records began. As Olivia continued towards the west, it then made a second landfall on the northeast coast of Lanai with heavy rains and gusty winds. Several homes were evacuated in Maui due to the threat of flooding, though overall damage was relatively minor, with some reports of downed trees and flooded roads.
The storms generated by Barbara's remnants were cited by Hawaiian Electric Industries as the likely cause of power outages affecting 45,000 electricity customers. 
Subsequently, Hurricane Flossie approaches Hawaii as a weakening tropical depression, before passing northeast of the Big Island and dissipated.

2020s
 July 2020: Hurricane Douglas passed just north of the Hawaiian Islands, bringing heavy rainfall and gusty winds to the island chain, though damage was minor. Despite this, it was the closest hurricane that has come to Oahu in recorded history.

Monthly statistics and landfalls

In total, 67 tropical cyclones have affected Hawaii since official record-keeping began in 1949.

Deadliest storms
At least 29 people have died in Hawaii as a result of tropical cyclones since 1949.

Hawaii's apparent immunity to most hurricanes 

The islands of Hawaii, with Kauai as the notable exception, appear to be remarkably immune from direct hurricane hits. The USGS states that "more commonly, near-misses that generate large swell and moderately high winds causing varying degrees of damage are the hallmark of hurricanes passing close to the islands." This has also drawn media attention.
One notion is that Hawaii's volcanic peaks slow down or divert storms.

A partial source of this idea may be the long list of hurricanes in the above paragraphs that dissipated into tropical storms or depressions upon approaching the islands. Satellite images of Hurricane Flossie's breakup when approaching Hawaii Island fueled this idea. Another example may be Hurricane Felicia which dropped from Category 4 down to a tropical depression with residual winds predicted at only .
Tropical Storm Flossie (not to be confused with Hurricane Flossie in 2007) provides still another example.  On July 28, 2013, the storm appeared headed for a direct hit to the Big Island, home to Mauna Kea and Mauna Loa.  Both mountains rise to elevations in excess of 13,000 feet above sea level, and as Flossie approached the island, its track shifted abruptly overnight and assumed a more northerly alignment, heading instead to the island of Maui on July 29.

Wind data in particular supports the USGS assertion that hurricane damage has been low on all islands except for Kauai. Data collected by the Western Regional Climate Center show no hurricane-strength winds on any Hawaii Islands with the exception of Kauai. Despite this data, FEMA classified all of Hawaii as being in a "Wind-Borne Debris Region".

Effect on homeowner's insurance

See also
Central Pacific Hurricane Center
List of Pacific hurricanes
Pacific hurricane season
List of wettest tropical cyclones to affect Hawaii
Tropical cyclone
Kona storm
List of Hawaii tornadoes

Notes

References

External links
 Eastern Pacific hurricane tracks
 Central Pacific hurricane climatology
 Central Pacific Hurricane Center archive
 History of Hurricanes in Hawaii, University of Hawaii
  Hawaii Hurricanes
  CPAC Hurricane Widget (current)

Lists of tropical cyclones in the United States
Hurricanes